Mussolini's War: Fascist Italy from Triumph to Collapse, 1935–1943 is a book by John Gooch, published in 2020.

Synopsis 

Mussolini's War is an account of the rise and fall of Benito Mussolini, until 8 September 1943.

Reception 
Mussolini's War won the Royal United Services Institute Duke of Wellington Medal for Military History for 2021. The book was also ranked 40th on The Daily Telegraph list of the 50 best books of 2020.

Critical reception was generally favourable. Simon Heffer described the book as "a superb work of scholarship" and rated it four out of five stars, but criticised the book as "not as readable as it should be" and argued it "would have benefited from more anecdote". Tony Barber praised the book's readability, and praised the narrative as "lucid" and the analysis as "perfectly judged". Caroline Moorehead called the work as a "scrupulous account of Mussolini's wars" in her review for The Guardian. R. J. B. Bosworth reviewed the book for Literary Review. Max Hastings reviewed the book for The Times.

References 

2020 non-fiction books
Books about Italy
Penguin Books books
Books about World War II
Benito Mussolini